Jan Jeřábek (born 12 February 1984) is a Czech football midfielder currently playing for FK Pardubice.

In a Bohemian Football League match against SK Kladno in November 2011, Jeřábek scored four goals, including two from the penalty spot as Pardubice ran out 5–2 winners.

References

External links
 
 
 Profile at FK Pardubice website 

1984 births
Living people
Czech footballers
FK Pardubice players
Association football midfielders
Czech National Football League players